Region 1 is the name of a Statistics Canada census division, one of six in the Northwest Territories, Canada. It was introduced in the 2011 census, along with Regions 2, 3, 4, 5 and 6, resulting in the abolition of the former census divisions of Fort Smith Region and Inuvik Region (the latter not to be confused with the modern-day administrative region of the same name). Unlike in some other provinces, census divisions do not reflect the organization of local government in the Northwest Territories. These areas exist solely for the purposes of statistical analysis and presentation; they have no government of their own.

Its territorial extent coincides with the Inuvik Region administrative region, which is somewhat smaller than the former census division of the same name.

It comprises the northern and western part of the Northwest Territories, with its main economic centre in the town of Inuvik.

Main languages in the Region include English (85.2%), Inuvialuktun (7.4%), Gwich'in (3.6%), Inuktitut (1.4%) and French (1.1%)

Demographics 

Communities

Town
Inuvik
Hamlets
Aklavik
Fort McPherson
Paulatuk
Sachs Harbour
Tuktoyaktuk
Ulukhaktok
Chartered community
Tsiigehtchic

References

Inuvik Region
Census divisions of the Canadian territories